Pruvotia is a genus of cavibelonian solenogaster. 

The position of this genus in the taxonomy is uncertain.

Species
 Pruvotia sopita (Pruvot, 1891)

References

 Thiele, J. 1894 Beiträge zur vergleichenden Anatomie der Amphineurem. I. Úber einige Neapeñer Solenogastres. Zeitschr. Wissensch. Zool., 58: 222-302 
 García-Álvarez O., Salvini-Plawen L.v., Urgorri V. & Troncoso J.S. (2014). Mollusca. Solenogastres, Caudofoveata, Monoplacophora. Fauna Iberica. 38: 1-294.

Solenogastres